Arthur "Montana" Taylor (1903 – c.1958) was an American boogie-woogie and piano blues pianist, best known for his recordings in the 1940s, and regarded as the leading exponent of the "barrelhouse" style of playing.

Life and career
Taylor was born in Butte, Montana, where his father owned a club. The family moved to Chicago and then, around 1910, to Indianapolis, where Taylor learned piano.  Later he moved to Cleveland, Ohio.  By 1929 he was back in Chicago, where he recorded a few tracks for Vocalion Records, including "Indiana Avenue Stomp" and "Detroit Rocks".

He then disappeared from the public record for some years, during which he may have given up playing piano.  However, in 1946 he was rediscovered by jazz fan Rudi Blesh, and was recorded both solo and as the accompanist  to Bertha "Chippie" Hill.  The later recordings proved he had lost none of his instrumental abilities, and had developed as a singer.

Taylor's final recordings were from a 1946 radio broadcast and after that he was reported working as a chauffeur.

Montana Taylor died soon after 1957, when he was last recorded as living in Cleveland.

In 1977, Taylor's complete recordings were compiled by Martin van Olderen for the Oldie Blues label. Included were two then recently discovered radio performances from 1946. In 2002 Document Records released the complete recordings on CD.

Discography

Singles
 1929 - "Whoop and Holler Stomp" b/w "Hayride Stomp" (Vocalion) - 78 rpm
 1929 - "Indiana Avenue Stomp" b/w "Detroit Rocks" (Vocalion) - 78 rpm

Albums
 1977 - Montana's Blues (Oldie Blues) - compilation LP with Montana Taylor's complete recordings
 2002 - Complete Recorded Works in Chronological Order 1929-1946 (Document Records) - compilation CD with Montana Taylor's complete recordings

References

External links
 Montana Taylor discography at Discogs
 Illustrated Montana Taylor discography

1903 births
1958 deaths
Boogie-woogie pianists
American blues pianists
American male pianists
People from Butte, Montana
Vocalion Records artists
20th-century American pianists
20th-century American male musicians